

N

Nabalamprophyllite (lamprophyllite, seidozerite: IMA2001-060) 9.BE.25   
Nabaphite (IMA1981-058) 8.CJ.15    (IUPAC: sodium barium phosphate nonahydrate)
Nabateaite (IMA2021-026) 8.FA.  [no] [no]
Nabesite (IMA2000-024) 9.EA.65   [no] (IUPAC: disodium beryllium decaoxytetrasilicate tetrahydrate)
Nabiasite (IMA1997-050) 8.BF.20    (IUPAC: barium nonamanganese dihydro hexavanadate)
Nabimusaite (nabimusaite, arctite: IMA2012-057) 9.A?.  [no] [no] (IUPAC: potassium dodecacalcium tetra(tetraoxysilicate) disulfate dioxofluoride)
Nabokoite (IMA1985-013a) 7.BC.20    (IUPAC: potassium heptacopper oxochloro tellurate(IV) pentasulfate)
Nacaphite (IMA1979-026) 8.BO.05    (IUPAC: disodium calcium fluoro phosphate)
Nacareniobsite-(Ce) (rinkite, seidozerite: IMA1987-040) 9.BE.20   
Nacrite (Y: 1807) 9.ED.05    (IUPAC: dialuminium pentaoxydisilicate tetrahydroxyl)
Nadorite (nadorite: 1870) 3.DC.30    (IUPAC: lead antimony(III) dioxochloride)
Nafeasite (IMA2021-103) 8.CF.  [no] [no]
Nafertisite (IMA1994-007) 9.EH.30   [no]
Nagashimalite (IMA1977-045) 9.CE.20   
Nagelschmidtite (IMA1987 s.p., 1942) 9.HA.60    (IUPAC: heptacalcium di(tetraoxosilicate) diphosphate) 
Nagyágite (Y: 1845) 2.HB.20a   
Nahcolite (Y: 1929) 5.AA.15    (IUPAC: sodium bicarbonate)
Nahpoite (IMA1981-002) 8.AD.05    (IUPAC: disodium hydroxophosphate)
Nakauriite (IMA1976-016) 7.DG.30    (IUPAC: octacopper hexahydro tetrasulfate carbonate octatetracontahydrate)
Nakkaalaaqite (IMA2020-059) 9.CJ.  [no] [no]
Naldrettite (IMA2004-007) 2.AC.25d    (IUPAC: dipalladium antimonide)
Nalipoite (IMA1990-030) 8.AA.25    (IUPAC: sodium dilithium phosphate)
Nalivkinite (IMA2006-038) 9.DC.05   [no]
Namansilite (IMA1989-026) 9.DA.25    (IUPAC: sodium manganese(III) hexaoxydisilicate)
Nambulite (rhodonite: IMA1971-032) 9.DK.05    (IUPAC: lithium tetramanganese(II) tetradecaoxypentasilicate hydroxyl)
Namibite (IMA1981-024) 8.BB.50    (IUPAC: copper dioxobismuth hydro vanadate)
Namuwite (ktenasite: IMA1981-020) 7.DD.50    (IUPAC: tetrazinc hexahydro sulfate tetrahydrate)
Nanlingite (IMA1985-xxx ?, 1976) 4.JB.25   
Nanpingite (mica: IMA1987-006) 9.EC.15    (IUPAC: cesium dialuminium (aluminotrisilicate) decaoxydedihydroxyl)
Nantokite (sphalerite: 1867) 3.AA.05    (IUPAC: copper chloride)
Naquite (silicide: IMA2010-010) 1.BB.15  [no]  (IUPAC: iron silicide)
Narsarsukite (IMA1967 s.p., 1901) 9.DJ.05   
Nashite (IMA2011-105) 8.0  [no] 
Nasinite (IMA1967 s.p., 1961) 6.EC.05    (IUPAC: disodium hydro octaoxodiborate dihydrate)
NasledoviteQ (alumohydrocalcite: 1959) 5.DB.05   
Nasonite (Y: 1899) 9.BE.77    (IUPAC: dicalcium hexalead tri(heptaoxodisilicate) dichloride)
Nastrophite (IMA1980-051) 8.CJ.15    (IUPAC: sodium strontium phosphate nonahydrate)
Nataliakulikite (perovskite: IMA2018-061) 9.0  [no] [no]
Nataliyamalikite (IMA2016-022) 3.0  [no] [no] (IUPAC: thallium(I) iodide)
Natalyite (pyroxene: IMA1984-053) 9.DA.25    (IUPAC: sodium vanadium(III) hexaoxydisilicate)
Natanite (perovskite, schoenfliesite: IMA1980-028) 4.FC.10    (IUPAC: iron(II) tin(IV) hexahydroxide)
Natisite (IMA1974-035) 9.AG.40a   
Natrite (IMA1981-005) 5.AA.10    (IUPAC: disodium carbonate)
Natroalunite (alunite: IMA1987 s.p., 1902 Rd) 7.BC.10    (IUPAC: sodium trialuminium hexahydro disulfate)
Natroaphthitalite (aphthitalite: IMA2018-091) 7.0  [no] [no] (IUPAC: potassium trisodium disulfate)
Natroboltwoodite (IMA2007 s.p., 1975) 9.AK.15    (IUPAC: sodium uranyl (trioxyhydroxyl silicate) monohydrate)
Natrochalcite (tsumcorite: 1908) 7.DF.15    (IUPAC: sodium dicopper hydro disulfate monohydrate)
Natrodufrénite (dufrénite: IMA1981-033) 8.DK.15    (IUPAC: sodium iron(II) pentairon(III) hexahydro tetraphosphate dihydrate)
NatroglaucoceriniteQ (woodwardite: IMA1995-025) 7.DD.35   [no]
Natrojarosite (alunite, alunite: IMA1987 s.p., 1902 Rd) 7.BC.10    (IUPAC: sodium triiron(III) hexahydro disulfate)
NatrokomaroviteN (komarovite: 1979) 9.CE.45   [no]
Natrolemoynite (lemoynite: IMA1996-063) 9.DP.35   [no] (IUPAC: tetrasodium dizirconium decasilicate hexacosaoxy hydrate)
Natrolite (zeolitic tectosilicate: IMA1997 s.p., 1803) 9.GA.05   
Natromarkeyite (markeyite: IMA2018-152) 5.0  [no] [no]
Natron (IMA1967 s.p., 1783) 5.CB.10    (IUPAC: disodium carbonate decahydrate)
Natronambulite (rhodonite: IMA1981-034) 9.DK.05   
NatroniobiteQ (oxide perovskite: 1962) 4.CC.30    (IUPAC: sodium niobium trioxide)
Natropalermoite (carminite: IMA2013-118) 8.0  [no] [no] (IUPAC: disodium strontium tetraluminium tetrahydro tetraphosphate)
Natropharmacoalumite (pharmacosiderite: IMA2010-009) 8.DK.12  [no]  (IUPAC: sodium tetraluminium tetrahydro triarsenate tetrahydrate)
Natropharmacosiderite (pharmacosiderite: IMA1983-025) 8.DK.10    (IUPAC: disodium tetrairon(III) pentahydro triarsenate heptahydrate)
Natrophilite (olivine: 1890) 8.AB.10    (IUPAC: sodium manganese(II) phosphate)
Natrophosphate (IMA1971-041) 8.DN.05    (IUPAC: heptasodium fluoro diphosphate nonadecahydrate)
Natrosilite (IMA1974-043) 9.EE.40    (IUPAC: disodium pentaoxydisilicate)
Natrosulfatourea (IMA2019-134) 10.0  [no] [no]
Natrotantite (IMA1980-026) 4.DJ.05    (IUPAC: disodium tetratantalium undecaoxide)
Natrotitanite (titanite: IMA2011-033) 9.AG.15  [no] 
Natrouranospinite (natroautunite: IMA2007 s.p., 1957) 8.EB.15    (IUPAC: disodium diuranyl diarsenate pentahydrate)
Natrowalentaite (walentaite: IMA2018-032a) 8.0  [no] [no]
Natroxalate (oxalate: IMA1994-053) 10.AB.60    (IUPAC: disodium oxalate)
Natrozippeite (zippeite: IMA1971-004) 7.EC.05    (IUPAC: pentasodium octauranyl trihydro pentaoxo tetrasulfate dodecahydrate)
Naujakasite (Y: 1933) 9.EG.10   
Naumannite (Y: 1828) 2.BA.55    (IUPAC: disilver selenide)
Navajoite (ajoite: 1954) 4.HG.30   
Navrotskyite (IMA2019-026) 7.0  [no] [no]
Nazarchukite (IMA2022-005) 8.AC.  [no] [no]
Nazarovite (phosphide: IMA2019-013)  1.0  [no] [no]
Nchwaningite (IMA1994-002) 9.DB.30   [no] (IUPAC: dimanganese trioxosilicate dihydroxyl monohydrate)
Nealite (IMA1979-050) 4.JD.05   [no] (IUPAC: tetralead iron tetrachloro diarsenite dihydrate)
Nechelyustovite (seidozerite, lamprophyllite: IMA2006-021) 09.BE.55   [no]
Nefedovite (IMA1982-048) 8.BO.30    (IUPAC: pentasodium tetracalcium fluoro tetraphosphate)
Negevite (phosphide: IMA2013-104) 1.0  [no] [no] (IUPAC: nickel diphosphide)
Neighborite (perovskite: IMA1967 s.p., 1961) 3.AA.35    (IUPAC: sodium magnesium trifluoride)
Nekoite (Y: 1956) 9.EA.45    (IUPAC: tricalcium pentadecaoxyhexasilicate heptahydrate)
Nekrasovite (germanite: IMA1983-051) 2.CB.30    (Cu13VSn3S16)
Nelenite (pyrosmalite: IMA1982-011) 9.EE.15   
Neltnerite (braunite: IMA1979-059) 9.AG.05    (IUPAC: calcium hexamagnesium(III) octaoxy(tetraoxysilicate))
Nenadkevichite (labuntsovite: 1955) 9.CE.30a   
Neotocite (allophane: 1849) 9.ED.20   
Nepheline (feldspathoid, nepheline: 1801) 9.FA.05    (IUPAC: potassium trisodium (hexadecaoxytetralumotetrasilicate))
Népouite (serpentine: 1907) 9.ED.15    (IUPAC: trinickel pentaoxodisilicate tetrahydroxyl)
Nepskoeite (IMA1996-016) 3.BD.20   [no] (IUPAC: tetramagnesium heptahydroxide chloride hexahydrate)
Neptunite (neptunite: 1893) 9.EH.05   
Neskevaaraite-Fe (labuntsovite: IMA2002-007) 9.CE.30h   
Nesquehonite (Y: 1890) 5.CA.05    (IUPAC: magnesium carbonate trihydrate)
Nestolaite (IMA2013-074) 4.0  [no] [no] (IUPAC: calcium selenite monohydrate)
Neustädtelite (IMA1998-016) 8.BK.10   
Nevadaite (IMA2002-035) 8.DC.60   
Nevskite (tetradymite: IMA1983-026) 2.DC.05    (IUPAC: bismuth (selenide,sulfide))
Newberyite (Y: 1879) 8.CE.10    (IUPAC: magnesium hydroxophosphate trihydrate)
Neyite (sulphosalt, neyite: IMA1968-017) 2.JB.25i    (Ag2Cu6Pb25Bi26S68)
Nežilovite (magnetoplumbite: IMA1994-020) 4.CC.45   [no]
Niahite (IMA1977-022) 8.CH.20    (IUPAC: ammonium manganese(II) phosphate monohydrate)
Niasite (IMA2019-105) 8.0  [no] [no]
NichromiteN (spinel: 1978) 4.BB.05   [no]
Nickel (IMA1966-039) 1.AA.05   
NickelalumiteN (chalcoalumite: 1980) 7.DD.75   [no]
Nickelaustinite (adelite: IMA1985-002) 8.BH.35    (IUPAC: calcium nickel hydro arsenate)
Nickelbischofite (IMA1978-056) 3.BB.20    (IUPAC: nickel dichloride hexahydrate)
Nickelblödite (blödite: IMA1976-014) 7.CC.50    (IUPAC: disodium nickel disulfate tetrahydrate)
Nickelboussingaultite (picromerite: IMA1975-037) 7.CC.60    (IUPAC: diammonium nickel disulfate hexahydrate)
Nickelhexahydrite (hexahydrite: IMA1968 s.p., 1965) 7.CB.25    (IUPAC: nickel sulfate hexahydrate)
Nickeline (nickeline: IMA1967 s.p., 1832) 2.CC.05    (IUPAC: nickel arsenide)
Nickellotharmeyerite (tsumcorite: IMA1999-008) 8.CG.15   [no] (IUPAC: calcium dinickel diarsenate dihydrate)
Nickelphosphide (phosphide: IMA1998-023) 1.BD.05    (IUPAC: trinickel phosphide)
Nickelpicromerite (picromerite: IMA2012-053) 7.CC.  [no] [no] (IUPAC: dipotassium nickel disulfate hexahydrate)
Nickelschneebergite (tsumcorite: IMA1999-028) 8.CG.15    (IUPAC: bismuth dinickel hydro diarsenate hydrate)
Nickelskutterudite (perovskite, skutterudite: IMA2007 s.p., 1893) 2.EC.05   
Nickeltalmessite (fairfieldite: IMA2008-051) 8.CG.35   [no] (IUPAC: dicalcium nickel diarsenate dihydrate)
Nickeltsumcorite (tsumcorite: IMA2013-117) 8.0  [no] [no]
Nickeltyrrellite (seleniospinel: IMA2018-110) 2.0  [no] [no] (IUPAC: copper dinickel tetraselenide)
Nickelzippeite (zippeite: IMA1971-005) 7.EC.05    (IUPAC: dinickel hexauranyl decahydro trisulfate hexadecahydrate)
Nickenichite (alluaudite: IMA1992-014) 8.AC.10   
Nickolayite (phosphide: IMA2018-126) 1.0  [no] [no] (IUPAC: iron molybdenum phosphide)
Nicksobolevite (IMA2012-097) 4.0  [no] [no] (IUPAC: heptacopper dioxohexachloro diselenite)
Niedermayrite (IMA1997-024) 7.DD.30    (IUPAC: tetracopper cadmium hexahydro disulfate tetrahydrate) 
Nielsbohrite (IMA2002-045b) 8.0   
Nielsenite (alloy: IMA2004-046) 1.AG.70    (IUPAC: palladium tricopper alloy)
Nierite (nitride: IMA1994-032) 1.DB.05    (IUPAC: trisilicon tetranitride)
Nifontovite (IMA1967 s.p., 1961) 6.CA.50    (IUPAC: tricalcium hexa[dihydroxoborate] dihydrate)
Niggliite (tin alloy: 1938) 1.AG.60    (IUPAC: platinum stannide)
Niigataite (epidote, clinozoisite: IMA2001-055) 9.BG.05   [no] (IUPAC: calcium strontium trialuminium (heptaoxodisilicate) (tetraoxosilicate) hydroxyl)
Nikischerite (hydrotalcite, wermlandite: IMA2001-039) 7.DD.35   [no]
Nikmelnikovite (garnet: IMA2018-043) 4.0  [no] [no]
Niksergievite (IMA2002-036) 9.EC.75   [no]
Nimite (chlorite: IMA1971 s.p., IMA1969-012) 9.EC.55   
Ningyoite (rhabdophane: IMA1962 s.p., 1959) 8.CJ.85   
Niningerite (rocksalt, galena: IMA1966-036) 2.CD.10    (IUPAC: magnesium sulfide)
Nioboaeschynite (aeschynite) 4.DF.05
Nioboaeschynite-(Ce) (IMA1987 s.p., 1960) 4.DF.05   
Nioboaeschynite-(Y) (IMA2003-038a) 4.DF.05    
Niobocarbide (carbide: IMA1995-035) 1.BA.20    (IUPAC: niobium carbide)
Nioboheftetjernite (wolframite: IMA2019-133) 4.0  [no] [no]
Nioboholtite (dumortierite: IMA2012-068) 9.A?.  [no] [no]
Niobokupletskite (astrophyllite, kupletskite: IMA1999-032) 9.DC.05   [no]
Niobophyllite (astrophyllite, astrophyllite: IMA1964-001) 9.DC.05   
Niocalite (wöhlerite: 1956) 9.BE.17    (IUPAC: heptacalcium niobium heptaoxodisilicate trioxofluoride)
Nipalarsite (IMA2018-075) 2.0  [no] [no] (IUPAC: octanickel tripalladium tetrarsenide)
Nisbite (löllingite: IMA1969-017) 2.EB.15a    (IUPAC: nickel diantimonide)
Nishanbaevite (IMA2019-012) 8.0  [no] [no]
Nisnite (auricupride: IMA2009-083) 1.0  [no] [no] (IUPAC: trinickel tin alloy)
Nissonite (IMA1966-026) 8.DC.05    (IUPAC: dicopper dimagnesium dihydro diphosphate pentahydrate)
Niter (nitrate: old) 5.NA.10    (IUPAC: potassium nitrate)
Nitratine (calcite: IMA1980 s.p., 1845) 5.NA.05    (IUPAC: sodium nitrate)
Nitrobarite (nitrate: 1882) 5.NA.20    (IUPAC: barium dinitrate)
Nitrocalcite (nitrate: 1783) 5.NC.10    (IUPAC: calcium dinitrate tetrahydrate)
Nitromagnesite (nitrate: 1783) 5.NC.05    (IUPAC: magnesium dinitrate hexahydrate)
Nitroplumbite (nitrate: IMA2021-045a) 5.NB.  [no] [no]
Nitscheite (IMA2020-078) 7.0  [no] [no]
Niveolanite (IMA2007-032) 5.DC.35    (IUPAC: sodium beryllium hydro carbonate dihydrate)
Nixonite (IMA2018-133) 4.0  [no] [no]
Nizamoffite (hopeite: IMA2012-076) 8.0  [no] [no]  
Nobleite (IMA1967 s.p., 1961) 6.FC.05   
Noelbensonite (IMA1994-058 Rd) 9.BE.05   [no]
Nöggerathite-(Ce) (zirconolite: IMA2017-107) 4.0  [no] [no]
Nolanite (nolanite: 1957) 4.CB.40   
Nollmotzite (IMA2017-100) 4.0  [no] [no]
Nolzeite (IMA2014-086) 9.0  [no] [no]
Nontronite (montmorillonite, smectite: IMA1962 s.p., 1928) 9.EC.40   
Noonkanbahite (batisite: IMA2009-059) 9.DH.  [no] 
Norbergite (humite: 1926) 9.AF.40   
Nordenskiöldine (Y: 1887) 6.AA.15    (IUPAC: calcium tin(IV) diborate)
Nordgauite (nordgauite: IMA2010-040) 8.DC.30  [no] 
Nordite (nordite) 9.DO.15
Nordite-(Ce) (IMA1966 s.p., 1958) 9.DO.15   [no]
Nordite-(La) (IMA1987 s.p., 1941) 9.DO.15   
Nordstrandite (IMA1967 s.p., 1958) 4.FE.10    (IUPAC: aluminium trihydroxide)
Nordströmite (IMA1978-073) 2.JB.25c    (Pb3CuBi7(S,Se)14)
Norilskite (alloy: IMA2015-008) 1.0  [no] [no] (IUPAC: hepta(palladium,silver) tetralead alloy)
Normandite (wöhlerite: IMA1990-021) 9.BE.17   [no]
Norrishite (mica: IMA1989-019) 9.EC.20    (IUPAC: potassium lithium dimanganese(III) dioxy dedecaoxytetrasilicate)
Norsethite (IMA1962 s.p.) 5.AB.30    (IUPAC: barium magnesium dicarbonate)
Northstarite (IMA2019-031) 7.0  [no] [no]
Northupite (northupite: 1895) 5.BF.05    (IUPAC: trisodium magnesium chloro dicarbonate)
Nosean (sodalite: 1815) 9.FB.10   
Nováčekite (IMA2007 s.p., 1951, 2022) 8.EB.05    (IUPAC: magnesium diuranyl diarsenate decahydrate)
Novákite (metalloid alloy: IMA1967 s.p., 1961) 2.AA.15   
Novgorodovaite (oxalate: IMA2000-039) 10.AB.80   [no] (IUPAC: dicalcium dichloro oxalate dihydrate)
Novodneprite (khatyrkite: IMA2002-032a) 1.AA.15   [no] (IUPAC: gold trilead alloy)
Novograblenovite (carnallite: IMA2017-060) 3.0  [no] [no] (IUPAC: (ammonium,potassium) magnesium trichloride hexahydrate)
Nowackiite (nowackiite: IMA1971 s.p., 1965) 2.GA.30    (Cu6Zn3As4S12)
Nsutite (ramsdellite: IMA1967 s.p., 1962) 4.DB.15c   
Nuffieldite (kobellite: IMA1967-003) 2.JB.25g    (Cu1.4Pb2.4Bi2.4Sb0.2S7)
Nukundamite (IMA1978-037) 2.CA.10    (Cu3.4Fe0.6S4)
Nullaginite (malachite: IMA1978-011) 5.BA.10    (IUPAC: dinickel dihydro carbonate)
Numanoite (IMA2005-050) 6.DA.40   
Nuragheite (IMA2013-088) 7.0  [no] [no] (IUPAC: thorium dimolybdate monohydrate)
Nuwaite (nuwaite: IMA2013-018) 2.0  [no] [no] (IUPAC: hexanickel germanium disulfide)
Nyboite [Na-amphibole: IMA2012 s.p., IMA1997 s.p., 1981] 9.DE.25   
Nyerereite (fairchildite: IMA1963-014) 5.AC.10    (IUPAC: disodium calcium dicarbonate)
Nyholmite (hureaulite: IMA2008-047) 8.CB.10  [no]  (IUPAC: tricadmium dizinc dihydroxoarsenate diarsenate tetrahydrate)

External links
IMA Database of Mineral Properties/ RRUFF Project
Mindat.org - The Mineral Database
Webmineral.com
Mineralatlas.eu minerals N